The second season of the Mexican telenovela Corona de lágrimas takes place 10 years after the events of the first season, that aired in 2012. The season is produced by José Alberto Castro for TelevisaUnivision.

The season was announced on 4 August 2021, and stars Victoria Ruffo, José María Torre, Mané de la Parra and Alejandro Nones.

The season premiered on 29 August 2022 and ended on 27 January 2023.

Plot 
Ten years after the imprisonment of Rómulo Ancira (Ernesto Laguardia) for his crimes, Refugio (Victoria Ruffo) and her sons: Patricio, Edmundo and Ignacio, have been coping with life and the consequences of their good and bad decisions. After Olga (Geraldine Bazán) leaves for Spain, she hands over to Patricio (Alejandro Nones) the guardianship of Esperanza (Lara Campos), their daughter. Refugio has managed to rebuild her life next to Julian Corona, with whom she has a happy marriage. They have established their home in Coyoacán and share it with Patricio and his daughter, whom is affectionately nicknamed "Petita", since her father has to travel frequently on business. As the years have passed, Petita has had the desire to meet her mother, whom she never saw again after her departure.

Edmundo (José María Torre) lives with his wife Lucero (África Zavala. Due to his criminal record, Edmundo has not been able to get a stable job. Ignacio (Mané de la Parra) traveled to Italy with Chelito, his girlfriend, but little by little her new profession and Ignacio's studies separated them. This led Ignacio to return to Mexico. The love and solidarity of the Chavero family will unite them in a single effort and objective when adversity confronts them again, embodied in the vileness of Rómulo Ancira, who threatens to destroy the happiness of Refugio and her family.

Cast 
 Victoria Ruffo as Refugio Chavero
 Maribel Guardia as Julieta Vázquez
 Ernesto Laguardia as Rómulo Ancira
 África Zavala as Lucero Vázquez
 Mané de la Parra as Ignacio Chavero
 José María Torre as Edmundo Chavero
 Alejandro Nones as Patricio Chavero
 René Strickler as Lázaro
 Lola Merino as Mercedes Ancira
 Sharis Cid as Diana
 Geraldine Bazán as Olga Ancira
 Ana Belena as Fernanda Varela
 Raquel Garza as Martina Durán
 Arturo Carmona as Apolinar Pantoja
 Lisardo as Dr. Rogelio Cáceres
 Amairani as Erika
 Daniela Álvarez as Eréndira
 Ulises de la Torre as Agustín Galindo
 Sebastián Poza as Renato
 Claudia Zepeda as Rebeca
 Paulette Hernández as Roxana
 Vicente Torres as Silvestre
 Ricardo Mendoza as Fidel
 Pisano as Germán Morales
 Carlos Velasco as Iñigo
 Martha Julia as Flor Escutia
 Humberto Elizondo as Ulloa
 Moisés Arizmendi as Bátiz
 María Clara Zurita as Guillermina
 Lara Campos as Esperanza "Petita" Chavero
 Roxana Castellanos as Leonarda

Guest stars 
 Pedro Moreno as Judge Julián Corona

Production

Development 
In May 2017, it was reported by People en Español that José Alberto Castro was planning on making a sequel series of Corona de lágrimas titled Los Chavero. In August 2021, Castro confirmed that the second season would begin filming in December 2021. In October 2021, the second season was presented at Televisa's upfront for 2022. Filming began on 6 December 2021.

Casting 
On 27 October 2021, Adriana Louvier confirmed that she would not be returning for the second season due to scheduling conflicts, being replaced by Geraldine Bazán in the role of Olga Ancira. On 6 December 2021, an extensive list of new and returning cast members was published by El sol de México.

Episodes

Notes

References 

2022 Mexican television seasons